Workington Central railway station was opened by the Cleator and Workington Junction Railway (C&WJR) in 1879 to serve the town of Workington in Cumberland (now in Cumbria), England. It was situated almost half a mile nearer the town centre than its rival Workington station.

History 
The line was one of the fruits of the rapid industrialisation of West Cumberland in the second half of the nineteenth century, specifically being born as a reaction to oligopolistic behaviour by the London and North Western and Whitehaven, Cleator and Egremont Railways. The line and station opened to passengers on 1 October 1879. Central Station was initially the northern terminus; the line was extended northwards to  a year later.

All lines in the area were primarily aimed at mineral traffic, notably iron ore, coal and limestone, none more so than the new line to Workington, which earned the local name "The Track of the Ironmasters". General goods and passenger services were provided, but were very small beer compared with mineral traffic.

The founding Act of Parliament of June 1878 confirmed the company's agreement with the Furness Railway that the latter would operate the line for one third of the receipts.

The line and station became part of the London, Midland and Scottish Railway at the Grouping of 1923. The station closed to passengers eight years later under this management.

The substantial stone station housed the headquarters of the C&WJR. There were sidings to the south of the platforms. An engine shed and wagon shops were added there in November 1897. The shed was closed in May 1923; the building was then used as a wagon repair shop for many years.

Services 
Passenger trains consisted of antiquated Furness stock hauled largely by elderly Furness engines referred to as "rolling ruins" by one author after a footplate ride in 1949.

No Sunday passenger service was ever provided on the line.

The initial passenger service in 1879 consisted of:
 They returned as Down trains, leaving Workington at 10:30 and 16:00

The service was extended to run to and from Siddick and an extra train was added with:
 Three up trains a day, leaving Moor Row at 07:40, 10:12 and 14:45, taking 30 minutes to Workington and an extra four to proceed to Siddick, where connections were made with northbound trains on the coastal line.
 Down trains left Siddick at 08:45, 12:22 and 17:00

By 1922 the service reached its high water mark with:
 Five up trains a day from Moor Row through to Siddick, leaving Moor Row at 07:20, 09:50, 13:15, 16:50 and 1820.
 One Saturdays Only train leaving Cleator Moor (NB not from Moor Row) at 12:50 for Workington
 One Saturdays Only train leaving Moor Row at 19:35 for Workington

Two Saturdays Only trains left  at 16:05 and 21:35 for Workington, calling at Distington and High Harrington, with balancing workings leaving Workington at 15:30 and 21:00.

As with advertised passenger trains, in 1920 workmen's trains ran on the company's three southern routes:
 Between Workington Central and Lowca using the Lowca Light Railway
 On the "main line" between Siddick Junction and Moor Row
 From Siddick Junction to Moor Row, calling at all passenger stations except Moresby Parks, calling at  instead 
The situation in 1922 was similar.

This line - opened in 1887 and often referred to as the "Northern Extension" - was the half-hearted outcome of what was originally intended as a direct cross-country route to Scotland for Cumberland ore. As conceived it would have continued the founders' approach of bypassing all established interests to join up with the Caledonian Railway and send its loads to Glasgow over the Solway Viaduct. In the end it met up with the Maryport and Carlisle Railway at Linefoot Junction "in the middle of nowhere, having gone there via nowhere else."

Ironically, part of this line would go on to be the last C&WJR metals to carry trains, outliving all other lines by nearly thirty years as the result of the Royal Navy using its combination of remoteness and dock access to establish an arms store at RNAD Broughton Moor. By Autumn 1922, however, that remoteness had killed attempts to run passenger trains. The last vestige was that on Saturdays Only, two of the Lowca to Workington trains shown above continued to and returned from Seaton.

The fifth route from Workington Central was authorised on 16 July 1883 and opened in March 1885. This never carried any passenger service, publicly advertised or for workmen.

In January 1898 the company agreed with the Postmaster General to carry a mail bag daily between Workington and Siddick and between Workington and Distington. It is likely that this was conveyed on passenger trains. At some point thereafter the service was extended to Rowrah. The "Mail Train" beyond Distington to Oatlands and Arlecdon usually consisted of a C&WJR 0-6-0ST and a guards van.

The 1920 Working Time Table shows relatively few Goods trains, with just one a day in each direction booked to call at Workington Central.

Mineral traffic was an altogether different matter, dwarfing all other traffic in volume, receipts and profits. The key source summarises it "...the 'Track of the Ironmasters' ran like a main traffic artery through an area honeycombed with mines, quarries and ironworks." The associated drama was all the greater because all the company's lines abounded with steep inclines and sharp curves, frequently requiring banking. The saving grace was that south of Workington at least, most gradients favoured loaded trains. During the First World War especially, the company ran "Double Trains", akin to North American practice, with two mineral trains coupled together and a banking engine behind, i.e. locomotive-wagons-guards van-locomotive-wagons-guards van-banker. The practice was discontinued after dark from 1 April 1918.

Most stations on the company's lines had heavy industrial neighbours, such as ironworks next to Cleator Moor West, or served primarily industrial workforces, such as Keekle Colliers' Platform. Workington Central was rather different, with vast heavy industry within a couple of miles of the station, but not served by it and a significant town surrounding the station but few populous destinations to serve.

Like any business tied to one or few industries, the railway was at the mercy of trade fluctuations and technological change. The Cumberland iron industry led the charge in the nineteenth century, but became less and less competitive as time passed and local ore became worked out and harder to win, taking the fortunes of the railway with it. The peak year was 1909, when 1,644,514 tons of freight were handled. Ominously for the line, that tonnage was down to just over 800,000 by 1922, bringing receipts of £83,349, compared with passenger fares totalling £6,570.

Rundown and closure 
The peak year for tonnage was 1909, and for progress was 1913, with the opening of the Harrington and Lowca line for passenger traffic. A chronology of the line's affairs from 1876 to 1992 has almost no entries before 1914 which fail to include "opened" or "commenced". After 1918 the position was reversed, when the litany of step-by-step closures and withdrawals was relieved only by a control cabin and a signalbox being erected at Harrington Junction in 1919 and the Admiralty saving the northern extension in 1937 by establishing an armaments depot at Broughton.

The public passenger service to Lowca ended on 31 May 1926, followed by the workmen's trains there on 1 April 1929.

The curve from Cloffocks Junction to the Workington-Penrith line was closed on 26 March 1930 and subsequently lifted. Its key role had been to give coke from County Durham an additional route to Workington's furnaces, known locally as "The Works".

Workington Central station closed to passengers on 13 April 1931 when normal passenger traffic ended along the line.

The most unusual special event was when the station was used as a set for part of the film The Stars Look Down shot in 1938 and released in 1940.

The Dock Branch, which veered west off the line to Siddick north of the station closed on 27 July 1936, ending another source of custom or potential traffic through the station.

The station, like a great many across the country, remained open for goods traffic. It closed in 1964, by which time road transport had picked off all commercially viable trade.

An enthusiasts' special ran through on 6 September 1954, the only one to do so using main line passenger stock. The next such train to traverse any C&WJR metals did so in 1966 at the north end of the line, a year after the line through Workington Central closed.

Afterlife 
By 2013 aerial images show the trackbed through the station site had become "Central Way" used by the West Cumbria Cycle Network. The line's bridge over the River Derwent north of the station had had its railway spans replaced with ones suitable for a foot and cycleway, using the original abutments.

See also 

 Maryport and Carlisle Railway
 Furness Railway
 Whitehaven, Cleator and Egremont Railway
 Cockermouth and Workington Railway

References

Sources

Further reading

External links 
 Map of the CWJR with photos RAILSCOT
 Map of the WC&ER with photos RAILSCOT
 The station Rail Map Online
 The station on overlain OS maps surveyed from 1898 National Library of Scotland
 The closed station on a 1948 OS Map npe maps
 The station and line railwaycodes
 The railways of Cumbria Cumbrian Railways Association
 Photos of Cumbrian railways Cumbrian Railways Association
 The railways of Cumbria Railways_of_Cumbria
 Cumbrian Industrial History Cumbria Industrial History Society
 Furness Railtour using many West Cumberland lines 5 September 1954 sixbellsjunction
 A video tour-de-force of the region's closed lines cumbriafilmarchive
 1882 RCH Diagram showing the station, see page 173 of the pdf google
 Haematite earthminerals
 Coal and iron ore mining in Cleator Moor Haig Pit
 Photos of the station, line, staff, tickets and timetables Harrington History

Disused railway stations in Cumbria
Railway stations in Great Britain opened in 1879
Railway stations in Great Britain closed in 1931
Former Cleator and Workington Junction Railway stations
Workington